The Other One is a British television comedy series broadcast on BBC One, written and directed by Holly Walsh and starring Ellie White, Lauren Socha, Rebecca Front and Siobhan Finneran.

Plot
The sitcom follows young Catherine "Cathy" Walcott (Ellie White) & her half sister, Catherine "Cat" Walcott (Lauren Socha), who had no idea of each other's existence until their father's untimely death at a birthday party.

Production
Walsh was inspired to write the sitcom after hearing a true story about a man with two families who gave his kids the same name to avoid confusion or being sprung.

Cast
Ellie White as Catherine "Cathy" Walcott, a woman who finds out she has a half-sister with the same name after her father's death
Lauren Socha as Catherine "Cat" Walcott, Cathy's younger half-sister, who is introduced to her at her father's funeral
Rebecca Front as Tess Walcott, Cathy's mother and the widow of Colin
Siobhan Finneran as Marilyn, Colin's eccentric mistress and the mother of Cat; she suffers from agoraphobia
Amit Shah as Marcus Tandell, Cathy's fiancé
Simon Greenall as Colin Walcott, Cathy and Cat's late father
Caroline Quentin as Auntie Dawn (Tess's Sister)
Shobu Kapoor as Mishti Tandell, Marcus' mother
Silas Carson as Shray Tandell, Marcus' father
Neil Pearson as Paul
Stephen Tompkinson as Mr Shipham
Maddie Rice as Meredith, Marcus' lover
Christopher Jeffers as Callum (Series 2)
Michele Austin as Angela, Callum's mother (Series 2)
Lolly Adefope as Pretty Cathy, one of Cathy’s old school friends (Series 2)

Episodes

Pilot (2017)

Series 1 (2020)

Series 2 (2022)

Broadcast
The Other One was broadcast on BBC1 weekly from Friday 5 June 2020 at 9pm starting with a repeat of the 2017 pilot., with all of the seven episodes of the first series available to watch on BBC iPlayer. The second series premiered on Friday 6 May 2022 at 9pm., with all of the five episodes of the second series available to watch on BBC iPlayer as well.

Reception
Critic Emily Baker in the i newspaper gave the first episode four stars and commented on the “stellar acting”.

References

External links
 
 
 

2017 British television series debuts
2010s British sitcoms
2020s British sitcoms
BBC television sitcoms
English-language television shows
Television series by Banijay
Television series by Tiger Aspect Productions